Larry Stewart (born September 21, 1968) is an American former professional basketball player, formerly of the National Basketball Association (NBA). He is currently an assistant coach at Maryland Eastern Shore.

Stewart attended Coppin State University where he led his team to the 1990 NCAA Tournament, the first appearance in school history. Coppin State was a 15 seed and lost to Derrick Coleman's Syracuse squad 70-48 in the first round. After college, he signed as an undrafted free agent with the Washington Bullets in 1991. He averaged 10.4 points, and 5.9 rebounds in his rookie season (1991–92), and became the first undrafted player in NBA history to make an All-NBA Rookie Team (2nd). His last NBA season was in 1996–97 with the Seattle SuperSonics, where he would make his only appearance in the playoffs. He also played in Greece for Panellinios BC.

Personal
At 4:30 AM on January 8, 1994, Stewart was shot and stabbed during a break-in at his Baltimore County home. He was taken to the University of Maryland Shock Trauma Center for treatment. Neither injury was fatal nor permanently damaging. Police said the suspects broke in by shattering a sliding door in the back of the house. They pulled Stewart from his bed, bound his hands and feet and shot him. Although Stewart could not describe his assailants he asserted four men were involved.

His younger brother, Stephen, is an assistant basketball coach, while his other younger brother Lynard played professional basketball overseas.

References

External links
 NBA stats @ basketballreference.com
 Whatever Happened to Former Bullet Larry Stewart? @ truthaboutit.net

1968 births
Living people
American expatriate basketball people in France
American expatriate basketball people in Greece
American expatriate basketball people in Spain
American expatriate basketball people in Turkey
American men's basketball players
American shooting survivors
Basketball coaches from Pennsylvania
Bowie State Bulldogs men's basketball coaches
CB Girona players
CB Zaragoza players
Coppin State Eagles men's basketball players
Galatasaray S.K. (men's basketball) players
Greek Basket League players
Liga ACB players
Maroussi B.C. players
Maryland Eastern Shore Hawks men's basketball coaches
Morgan State Bears men's basketball coaches
Olympia Larissa B.C. players
Panellinios B.C. players
Paris Racing Basket players
Peristeri B.C. players
Power forwards (basketball)
Quad City Thunder players
Seattle SuperSonics players
Small forwards
Sportspeople from Philadelphia
UJAP Quimper 29 players
Undrafted National Basketball Association players
Vancouver Grizzlies expansion draft picks
Washington Bullets players
Basketball players from Philadelphia